Artistic swimming as Synchronized swimming was contested from December 8 to December 9 at the 2006 Asian Games in Doha, Qatar, with all events taking place at the Hamad Aquatic Centre. For the first time in this edition the organizers replaced the solo event with a team event. China won both gold medals and topped the medal table, Japan finished second with two silver medals. North Korea and Kazakhstan won one bronze medal each.

Schedule

Medalists

Medal table

Participating nations
A total of 67 athletes from 9 nations competed in artistic swimming at the 2006 Asian Games:

References

External links 
 Olympic Council of Asia

 
2006
Asian Games
2006 Asian Games events